Edward John Sparks (1897 – 1976) was an American diplomat who served as the United States ambassador to Bolivia, Guatemala, Venezuela, and Uruguay.

Background 
Sparks was born in Jersey City, New Jersey. He began his career as a clerk in the United States Department of War and was later sent to Santiago to serve as a military attaché. He later joined the United States Foreign Service. Sparks spent his career in various diplomatic positions in Latin America. He was also assigned to a post in Copenhagen for three years. Sparks retired in 1962 and moved to Santiago, Chile.

References 

1897 births
1976 deaths
People from Jersey City, New Jersey
Ambassadors of the United States to Bolivia
Ambassadors of the United States to Venezuela
Ambassadors of the United States to Guatemala
Ambassadors of the United States to Uruguay
United States Foreign Service personnel
United States Department of War officials